The 2004/05 FIS Freestyle Skiing World Cup was the twenty sixth World Cup season in freestyle skiing organised by International Ski Federation. The season started on 4 September 2004 and ended on 11 March 2005. This season included three disciplines: aerials, moguls and ski cross. Halfpipe was also on schedule but all events were cancelled and so crystal globes were not awarded.

There were no dual mogul events on world cup calendar this season.

Men

Aerials

Moguls

Ski Cross

Halfpipe

Ladies

Aerials

Moguls

Ski Cross

Halfpipe

Men's standings

Overall 

Standings after 29 races.

Moguls 

Standings after 11 races.

Aerials 

Standings after 12 races.

Ski Cross 

Standings after 6 races.

Ladies' standings

Overall 

Standings after 29 races.

Moguls 

Standings after 11 races.

Aerials 

Standings after 12 races.

Ski Cross 

Standings after 6 races.

Nations Cup

Overall 

Standings after 58 races.

Men 

Standings after 29 races.

Ladies 

Standings after 29 races.

Footnotes

References

External links

FIS Freestyle Skiing World Cup
World Cup
World Cup